The Ukraine women's national artistic gymnastics team represents Ukraine in FIG international competitions.

History
After the fall of the Soviet Union, a handful of former Soviet gymnasts started competing for Ukraine.  They participated as a team in the 1996, 2000, and 2004 Olympic Games. In 1999, they won their only World Championships team medal, a bronze.

Senior roster

Team competition results

Olympic Games
 1996 — 5th place
Lilia Podkopayeva, Svetlana Zelepukina, Liubov Sheremeta, Anna Mirgorodskaya, Oksana Knizhnik, Olena Shaparna, Olga Teslenko
 2000 — 5th place
Viktoria Karpenko, Tetyana Yarosh, Olga Roshchupkina, Halyna Tyryk, Olha Teslenko, Alona Kvasha
 2004 — 4th place
Mirabella Akhunu, Alina Kozich, Iryna Krasnianska, Alona Kvasha, Olga Sherbatykh, Irina Yarotska
 2008 — 11th place
Valentyna Holenkova, Alina Kozich, Iryna Krasnianska, Maryna Proskurina, Dariya Zgoba, Anastasia Koval
 2012 — did not participate
 2016 — did not participate
 2020 — did not participate

World Championships

 1994 — 5th place
Irina Bulakhova, Lilia Podkopayeva, Elena Shapornaya, Natalia Paneteleyeva, Oksana Knizhnik, Tatiana Malaya, Olesia Shulga
 1995 — 5th place
Lilia Podkopayeva, Irina Bulakhova, Anna Mirgorodskaya, Olena Shaparna, Oksana Knizhnik, Svetlana Zelepukina, Viktoria Karpenko
 1997 — 4th place
Liubov Sheremeta, Olga Teslenko, Inga Shkarupa, Galina Tyryk
 1999 —  bronze medal
Viktoria Karpenko, Tatiana Yarosh, Inga Shkarupa, Olga Teslenko, Olga Roschupkina, Nataliya Horodny
 2001 — 6th place
Natalia Sirobaba, Alona Kvasha, Tatiana Yarosh, Irina Yarotska, Olga Roschupkina
 2003 — 7th place
Irina Yarotska, Alina Kozich, Irina Krasnyanska, Alona Kvasha, Marina Proskurina, Natalia Sirobaba
 2006 — 5th place
Olga Shcherbatykh, Iryna Krasnianska, Dariya Zgoba, Alina Kozich, Marina Proskurina, Marina Kostiuchenko
 2007 — 9th place
Valentyna Holenkova, Anastasia Koval, Alina Kozich, Marina Proskurina, Olga Sherbatykh, Dariya Zgoba
 2010 — 12th place
Valentyna Holenkova, Alona Kaydalova, Yevheniya Cherniy, Anastasia Koval, Yana Demyanchuk, Alina Fomenko
 2011 — did not participate
 2014 — 27th place (did not qualify for team final)
Yana Fedorova, Anastasiya Ilnytska, Angelina Kysla, Daria Matveieva, Krystyna Sankova, Olesya Sazonova
 2015 — did not participate
 2018 — 20th place (did not qualify for team final)
Yana Fedorova, Valeria Osipova, Angelina Radivilova, Diana Varinska
 2019 — 15th place (did not qualify for team final)
Anastasia Bachynska, Yana Fedorova, Valeria Osipova, Angelina Radivilova, Diana Varinska
 2022 — 23rd place (did not qualify for team final)
 Yelizaveta Hubareva, Yulia Kasianenko, Marharyta Kozlovska, Valeria Osipova, Diana Savelieva

Junior World Championships
2019 — 13th place
Yelizaveta Hubareva, Anastasia Motak, Daria Murzhak

Most decorated gymnasts
This list includes all Ukrainian female artistic gymnasts who have won a medal at the Olympic Games or the World Artistic Gymnastics Championships.  Medals won as part of the Soviet Union, the Unified Team at the Olympics, or the Commonwealth of Independent States are not included.

See also 
 List of Olympic female artistic gymnasts for Ukraine
 Ukraine men's national gymnastics team
 Soviet Union women's national artistic gymnastics team

References

National women's artistic gymnastics teams
Gymnastics
Gymnastics in Ukraine